The skrabalai is a Lithuanian folk tuned percussion instrument consisting of wooden bells. Trapezoid-shaped wooden troughs of various sizes in several vertical rows with one or two wooden or metal small clappers hanging inside them. It is played with two wooden sticks. When the skrabalai is moved a clapper knocks at the wall of the trough. The pitch of the sound depends on the size of the wooden trough.

The skrabalai is gouged from a piece of hard wood – oak or ash. The size of the troughs varies from small ones (7–12 cm. long, 5–  cm. wide, 6–7 cm. high), to larger ones. The walls are 2–3 cm. thick.
The skrabalai was used by shepherds from ancient times. They used to tie a wooden bell of this kind on a cow's neck, thus making it easier to find the animals in a forest if they strayed from the herd.

External links
Skrabalai audio examples

Lithuanian musical instruments
Struck idiophones
Bells (percussion)
Pitched percussion instruments